There have been three baronetcies created for persons with the surname Paul, one in the Baronetage of Great Britain, one in the Baronetage of Ireland and one in the Baronetage of the United Kingdom. All three creations are extinct.

The Paul Baronetcy, of Rodborough in the County of Gloucester, was created in the Baronetage of Great Britain on 3 September 1762 for the clothier Onesiphorus Paul, who was High Sheriff of Gloucestershire in 1760. The second Baronet was a philanthropist and prison reformer and also served as High Sheriff of Gloucestershire in 1780. The title became extinct on his death in 1820.

The Paul Baronetcy, of Paulville in the County of Carlow, was created in the Baronetage of Ireland on 20 January 1794 for Joshua Paul. The title became extinct on the death of the sixth Baronet in 1961.

The Paul Baronetcy, of Rodborough in the County of Gloucester, was created in the Baronetage of the United Kingdom on 3 September 1821 for John Paul. The second Baronet was involved in the banking firm Strahan, Paul & Co, but was convicted of fraud. The title became extinct on the death of the sixth Baronet in 1972.

Paul baronets, of Rodborough (1762)

Sir Onesiphorus Paul, 1st Baronet (–1774)
Sir George Onesiphorus Paul, 2nd Baronet (1746–1820)

Paul baronets, of Paulville (1794)

Sir Joshua Paul, 1st Baronet (1748–1799)
Sir Joshua Christmas Paul, 2nd Baronet (1773–1842)
Sir Robert Joshua Paul, 3rd Baronet (1820–1898)
Sir William Joshua Paul, 4th Baronet (1851–1912)
Sir Robert Joshua Paul, 5th Baronet (1883–1955)
Sir William Edmund Jeffrey Paul, 6th Baronet (1885–1961)

Paul baronets, of Rodborough (1821)
Sir John Dean Paul, 1st Baronet (1775–1852)
Sir John Dean Paul, 2nd Baronet (1802–1868)
Sir Aubrey John Dean Paul, 3rd Baronet (1829–1890)
Sir Edward John Dean Paul, 4th Baronet (1831–1895)
Sir Aubrey Edward Henry Dean Paul, 5th Baronet (1869–1961)
Sir Brian Kenneth Dean Paul, 6th Baronet (1904–1972)

References

Extinct baronetcies in the Baronetage of Ireland
Extinct baronetcies in the Baronetage of Great Britain
Extinct baronetcies in the Baronetage of the United Kingdom